B. montana may refer to:

Banksia montana, the Stirling Range dryandra, a shrub of the family Proteaceae
Belantsea montana, an extinct petalodontid cartilaginous fish
Bigotilia montana, a moth of the family Pterophoridae
Borboniella montana, a moth of the family Tortricidae
Bosara montana, a moth of the family Geometridae
Brachychampsa montana, an extinct alligatoroid
Brachypteryx montana, the white-browed shortwing
Bryotropha montana, a moth of the family Gelechiidae
Bucculatrix montana, a moth in the family Bucculatricidae
Buddleja montana, a shrub of the figwort family